The , signed as Route 3, is one of the routes of the Hanshin Expressway system serving the Keihanshin area in Kansai, Japan.

Route description
The Kobe Route begins at Awaza Junction in Nishi-ku, Osaka, where it meets the Ōsakakō Route. From there it travels west from central Osaka. It meets the planned outer loop expressway of the city, the partially completed Yodogawa-Sagan Route, on the southern bank of the Yodo River. After this, the expressway crosses into the city of Amagasaki in eastern Hyōgo Prefecture. Upon entering Amagasaki, the expressway meets National Route 43, which then travels directly alongside the expressway all the way to Kobe.

Along the way to Kobe the expressway has a junction with the Meishin Expressway, the western terminus of that expressway, though direct access to the Meishin Expressway is limited with access being completed via National Route 43.  In Nada-ku, Kobe, National Route 43 diverges from the Kobe Route and ends at an intersection with National Route 2. National Route 2 then takes its place as the parallel road for the Kobe Route through central Kobe.

In central Kobe, the expressway closely follows the coastline of the Port of Kobe. Along this stretch of the route, a junction connects the expressway to the Shin-Kobe Tunnel. Continuing west, the expressway leaves the coastline and central Kobe. It then curves north in Suma-ku, Kobe, leaving National Route 2. The expressway meets its western terminus in the ward, but continues west as the Daini-Shinmei Road.

History

The first section of the Kobe Route was opened in 1966. The elevated section of the expressway in central Kobe was built in 1969 during the preparation for the Expo '70 world's fair held in nearby Suita. 

When 18 spans of this section collapsed in 1995 during the Great Hanshin earthquake, the stricken expressway became a focal point of the disaster for the media. The structure could not resist the forces of the unprecedented earthquake due to various design inadequacies, including too shallow a foundation for the support pillars and a lack of sufficient either external or internal transverse reinforcement for the pillars. The collapse of the structure did not result in any casualties. The elevated expressway was rebuilt by the end of 1996 and the surviving pillars were retrofitted with steel sheathing to prevent the same type of failure from recurring.

On 18 December 2010, the Kobe Route was linked to the Kobe-Yamate Route after Minatogawa Junction was opened to traffic. On 31 October 2016, Amagasaki-Shūya Toll Gate was removed, it was replaced with a parking area that opened on 19 March 2019.

List of interchanges

See also

References

External links

Roads in Hyōgo Prefecture
Roads in Osaka Prefecture
3
1966 establishments in Japan
Transport infrastructure completed in 1966